Vir Pal  is an Indian politician and a member of the 16th Legislative Assembly of Uttar Pradesh of India. He represents the Chhaprauli constituency of Uttar Pradesh and is a member of the Rashtriya Lok Dal political party.

Early life and  education
Vir Pal was born in Baghpat district, Uttar Pradesh. He attended the D.A.V. Inter college in Bagpat and received education till twelfth grade.

Political career
Vir Pal has been a MLA for one term. He represented the Chhaprauli constituency and is a member of the Rashtriya Lok Dal political party.

Posts held

See also
Chhaprauli
Sixteenth Legislative Assembly of Uttar Pradesh
Uttar Pradesh Legislative Assembly

References 

Rashtriya Lok Dal politicians
Uttar Pradesh MLAs 2012–2017
People from Bagpat district
1961 births
Living people